Andrew Francis Lawler (born May 25, 1961) is an American journalist and author. He has written for The New York Times, National Geographic, Science (journal), Archaeology (magazine), and other publications. Lawler investigated the looting the  National Museum of Iraq in Baghdad as well as ancient sites during the American-led 2003  Iraq invasion. He also reported on cultural heritage destruction in Afghanistan from the Taliban’s 2001 fall from power until their return in 2021.  

Lawler has written three books, including The Secret Token: Myth, Obsession, and the Search for the Lost Colony of Roanoke. “Mr. Lawler is an intrepid guide to this treacherous territory,” noted The Economist, which called The Secret Token “lively and engaging,” though the Wall Street Journal chided the author for giving a “social justice” spin to the tale.  His most recent publication is Under Jerusalem: The Buried History of the World’s Most Contested City, which The Washington Post called "a sweeping tale of archaeological exploits and their cultural and political consequences told with a historian’s penchant for detail and a journalist’s flair for narration."

Works

References

External links

1961 births
The New York Times writers
21st-century American journalists
20th-century American journalists
American male journalists
National Geographic people
21st-century American male writers
20th-century American male writers
21st-century American non-fiction writers
20th-century American non-fiction writers
Living people